Manic Pop Thrill is the debut studio album by Irish indie rock band That Petrol Emotion. It was released in 1986, through record label Demon.

Two singles were released from the album: "It's a Good Thing" and "Natural Kind of Joy".

Release and reception
Manic Pop Thrill reached No. 84 in the UK Albums Chart.

AllMusic called Manic Pop Thrill "an inspired debut".

Track listing 

13-15 were also bonus tracks on the original 1986 Demon CD release.  One edition of the Demon LP included the "It's a Good Thing" 12" single (c/w "The Deadbeat" and "Mine") as a bonus record, complete with picture sleeve.

Personnel
That Petrol Emotion
 Steve Mack - vocals
 John O'Neill - guitar
 Raymond  O'Gorman - guitar, vocals, keyboards
 Damian O'Neill - bass, vocals, keyboards
 Ciaran McLaughlin - drums, percussion

References

External links 

 

1986 debut albums
That Petrol Emotion albums
Albums produced by Hugh Jones (producer)